"Escape Velocity" is a song by The Chemical Brothers, released as a white label promotional single from their 2010 album Further. The version that appears on the single is different from that found on the album, in that it features no transition out of "Snow" or into "Another World."

The song was broadcast in part on Pete Tong's radio show on BBC Radio 1. It was also played before its release in a Chemical Brothers DJ set at Coachella 2009, along with "Don't Think," which was ultimately released as a bonus track on the iTunes edition of Further. It was also used in the videogame Gran Turismo 5.

Track listing
Promotional vinyl 
11:50 – (single version)
(B-side features an etching of lines resembling those on the sleeve art)

References

2010 singles
The Chemical Brothers songs
2010 songs
Songs written by Tom Rowlands
Songs written by Ed Simons
Parlophone singles